These are the results of the 1991 American Professional Soccer League season.

Regular season

American Conference

Western Conference

Playoffs

Bracket

Semifinal 1

The Albany Capitals advanced to the final.

Semifinal 2

The San Francisco Bay Blackhawks advanced to the final.

Final

The San Francisco Bay Blackhawks win the APSL Championship.

Points leaders

Honors
 MVP: Jean Harbor
 Leading goal scorer: Jean Harbor
 Leading goalkeeper: Mark Dougherty
 Rookie of the Year: Zico Doe
 Coach of the Year: Gary Hindley
First Team All League
Goalkeeper: Mark Dougherty
Defenders: Marcelo Balboa, Troy Dayak, Danny Pena, Derek Van Rheenen
Midfielders: Townsend Qin, Ramiro Borja, Kevin Sloan
Forwards: Zico Doe, Jean Harbor, Derek Sanderson
Second Team All League
Goalkeeper: Scoop Stanisic
Defenders: Robin Fraser, Paul Mariner, Jimmy McGeough, Jr., Chris Reif
Midfielders: Marcelo Carrera, Paul Dougherty, Dominic Kinnear
Forwards: Chance Fry, Bryan Haynes, Mike Masters
Honorable Mention All League
Goalkeeper: Arnie Mausser
Defenders: Steve Pittman, Jeff Agoos, George Gelnovatch, Steve Eise
Midfielders: John Garvey, Jeff Baicher, Chad Ashton
Forwards: Ken Snow, Scott Benedetti, Eric Wynalda

External links
 The Year in American Soccer – 1991
 USA – A-League (American Professional Soccer League) (RSSSF)

	

APSL/A-League seasons
1